Dennis Sullivan (born 1941) is an American mathematician.

Dennis Sullivan may also refer to:
Dennis Sullivan (cricketer) (1883–1968), English cricketer
Dennis B. Sullivan (1927–2020), U.S. Air Force general
Dennis Joseph Sullivan (born 1945), American prelate of the Roman Catholic Church
Dennis Mark Sullivan (1841-1917), American businessman and politician
Dennis Michael Sullivan, American electrical engineer
Dennis T. Sullivan (died 1906), American Chief of the San Francisco Fire Department in 1906
Dennis Sullivan, producer of Pork, a political talk show on the America's Talking network

See also
Denis Sullivan (disambiguation)
Dennis O'Sullivan (disambiguation)